is a city located in Shizuoka Prefecture, Japan. Omaezaki is located at the tip of Omaezaki Peninsula on Japan's Pacific coast. ,  the city had an estimated population of 32,422 in 12,095 households  and a population density of 490 persons per km2.

Geography 
The majority of the city consists of gentle hills and valleys with some steep cliffs on the peninsula's east coast. Like much of Japan, Shizuoka Prefecture is an earthquake zone, and small tremors frequently occur in the area. Omaezaki is also in an area at risk from tsunami.

Surrounding municipalities
Shizuoka Prefecture
Makinohara
Kikugawa
Kakegawa

Climate
Omaezaki has a humid subtropical climate (Köppen climate classification Cfa). Due to its location, Omaezaki experiences strong coastal winds between October and April. The Japanese rainy season also affects Omaezaki, with typhoons liable to hit the city between July and September.

Demographics
Per Japanese census data, the population of Omaezaki has fairly constant over the past 50 years.

History 
With the establishment of the modern municipalities system on April 1, 1889, the  village of Omaezaki was created within Haibara District of Shizuoka Prefecture. It was elevated to town status on March 31, 1955. On April 1, 2004, Omaezaki merged with the town of Hamaoka (formerly of the now-defunct Ogasa District) to form the city of Omaezaki.

During the 2002 FIFA World Cup, the England national football team was based in former Hamaoka Town.

Government
Omaezaki has a mayor-council form of government with a directly elected mayor and a unicameral city legislature of 16 members.

Economy 
Omaezaki has a long history of commercial fishing and of green tea cultivation and these continue to play a central role in the local economy. More recently, the Hamaoka Nuclear Power Plant situated in the former town of Hamaoka brought investment to the city; however, operations at the plant have been suspended from May 2011. Water sports account for a large number of visitors daily to the city, and during the summer months, tourism attracted by Omaezaki's beaches is an important part of the economy, and water sports made possible by strong coastal winds have become as much a part of Omaezaki's identity as that of a rural town.

Education
Omaezaki has five public elementary schools and two public middle schools and one high public school operated by the city government, and one public high school operated by the Shizuoka Prefectural Board of Education. There is also one vocational training school.

Transportation

Railway
Omaezaki does not have any passenger rail services.

Highway

Seaports
 Port of Omaezaki

Local attractions
Omaezaki City has long been famed for its Omaesaki Lighthouse and its extensive green tea fields. In recent years the Hamaoka Nuclear Power Plant, the visitor centre of which also hosts an Omnimax Cinema, has become a well-known local landmark. Due to the active seismic nature of the region, the nuclear power station has been built to a high level of safety, and its operator, Chubu Electric Power, claims that it can withstand strong tremors.

Culture 
As a result of the strong coastal winds, Omaezaki offers some of the best windsurfing in Japan. As well as being Japan's most famous windsurfing spot, Omaezaki is renowned as a popular surfing and bodyboarding destination.

Sister city relations
  Takamori, Nagano since September 24, 2007
 - Uljin County, North Gyeongsang, South Korea, since August 4, 2009

References

External links

 

Cities in Shizuoka Prefecture
Port settlements in Japan
Populated coastal places in Japan
Omaezaki, Shizuoka